Southgate is a suburb of Wellington, New Zealand, in the  Paekawakawa/Southern Ward. The main road is Buckley Road, which runs south from the point at which Mount Albert Road changes name to Houghton Bay Road. 

The earliest residential housing was at the beginning of the 20th century. A housing development was created on Buckley Road in 1957, and another ten years later. Most houses in the suburb were built in the 1970s.

Demographics 

Southgate had a population of 1,164 at the 2018 New Zealand census, a decrease of 12 people (-1.0%) since the 2013 census, and a decrease of 9 people (-0.8%) since the 2006 census. There were 432 households. There were 552 males and 612 females, giving a sex ratio of 0.9 males per female. The median age was 40.8 years (compared with 37.4 years nationally), with 204 people (17.5%) aged under 15 years, 219 (18.8%) aged 15 to 29, 600 (51.5%) aged 30 to 64, and 141 (12.1%) aged 65 or older.

Ethnicities were 80.9% European/Pākehā, 10.1% Māori, 7.2% Pacific peoples, 11.9% Asian, and 3.6% other ethnicities (totals add to more than 100% since people could identify with multiple ethnicities).

The proportion of people born overseas was 29.9%, compared with 27.1% nationally.

Although some people objected to giving their religion, 50.0% had no religion, 32.7% were Christian, 4.9% were Hindu, 1.0% were Muslim, 0.3% were Buddhist and 3.6% had other religions.

Of those at least 15 years old, 369 (38.4%) people had a bachelor or higher degree, and 99 (10.3%) people had no formal qualifications. The median income was $43,200, compared with $31,800 nationally. The employment status of those at least 15 was that 561 (58.4%) people were employed full-time, 132 (13.8%) were part-time, and 42 (4.4%) were unemployed.

References

Suburbs of Wellington City